Stockcross and Bagnor Halt railway station was a railway station near Newbury, Berkshire, UK, on the Lambourn Valley Railway. It served the villages of Stockcross and Bagnor.

History 
The station opened on 4 April 1898. Originally named Stockcross, it soon became Stockcross and Bagnor.

Passenger traffic
Until 1905 it was manned, after which station staff would be drafted in from nearby Boxford railway station as necessary. On 9 July 1934, the station was down-classified to a "halt".

Goods traffic
The station often dealt with light goods, including dairy produce.  It was used to transport racehorses to and from the nearby Marsh Benham stud.

Closure
The station closed on 4 January 1960.

References 

Lambourn Valley Railway
Disused railway stations in Berkshire
Former Great Western Railway stations
Railway stations in Great Britain opened in 1898
Railway stations in Great Britain closed in 1960